Philippe Diallo is a French football administrator who is the president of the French Football Federation.

Career

In 2023, Diallo was appointed president of the French Football Federation.

References

External links

  

French people of Senegalese descent
Living people